Ghetto Justice (Traditional Chinese: 怒火街頭) is a TVB modern drama series about a former talented lawyer who fights injustice for the people of the Sham Shui Po district in Hong Kong, starring Kevin Cheng, Myolie Wu, Sharon Chan and Sam Lee as the main cast. The series became a success and was followed by a sequel, Ghetto Justice II.

Plot
Growing up in Sham Shui Po Kris Wong Si-fu (Myolie Wu) is  an aspiring barrister who wishes to leave behind her grass root beginnings; her greatest desire being to share chambers with renowned barrister Spencer Cheung Pak-kei (Shek Sau). A resident of Sham Shui Po, Law Lik-ah (Kevin Cheng) runs  a legal clinic at a social centre with his cousin George Mike, Jr (Alex Lam) and social worker Tin Ka-fu (Sam Lee). After several run-ins and misunderstandings with Kris, Law begins to have feelings for Kris, however Kris holds the unkept and uncouth Law in utter disdain.

Although he has limited himself to just giving advice when a friend falls foul of the law, Law Lik-ah decides to act in court once more. To her amazement Kris discovers that Law Lik-ah used to be known by the nickname LA Law, a barrister almost as famous as Spencer Cheung, and who disappeared from the legal profession after being in contempt of court.

As they co-operate on different cases Kris learns the reason for Law's premature retirement. In order to defend a client on a murder case, Law accused the brother of the victim of the crime, which although unprovable, cast so much doubt as to the guilt of his client that his client was acquitted. However the innocent man was unable to live with the accusation and killed himself. Kris initially holds that a barrister should defend her client with whatever means available and that it is up to the judge and jury to decide guilt. However, as they encounter wealthy individuals who attempt to use the law to escape justice she comes to accept that in addition to possible fame and remuneration a barrister should have a conscience. As they come to understand each other they become lovers, and Law decides to open chambers again in order to be able to provide for Kris.

When Kris's friend Ho Lee-ching (Sharon Chan) stumbles on Spencer's illegal machinations she is murdered. In order to gain justice for Lee-ching, Kris feigns indifference to her death and joining Spencer's legal team creates a scenario in which he incriminates himself. Calculating what Kris intends, Law acts to protect Kris and her ability to continue to be a barrister, he arranges evidence about the plot to point towards himself, and is disbarred and sentenced for two years in her stead.

Cast

Sham Shui Po Civic Legal Advice Centre

Wong's family

Ting's family

Mai's family

Leung's family

Legal cases

Sheung Chau-ping murder (Episode 2 - 4)

Fuk Yuen Restaurant theft (Episode 5 - 6)

Yam Yuen-yuen murder (Episode 8 - 11)

Miu Yeuk Lai murder (Episode 12 - 15)

Tai-Ng Ting wounding assault (Episode 17)

Wong Tsz-kin murder (Episode 18 - 19)

Ho Lee-ching murder (Episode 19 - 20)

Others

Awards and nominations

43rd Ming Pao Anniversary Awards 2011
 Nominated: Outstanding Programme
 Nominated: Outstanding Actor in Television (Kevin Cheng)
 Nominated: Outstanding Actress in Television (Myolie Wu)
 Nominated: Outstanding Crew in Television (Tong Kei Ming)

45th TVB Anniversary Awards 2011
 Won: Best Actor (Kevin Cheng)
 Won: Best Supporting Actress (Sharon Chan)
 Won: My Favourite Male Character (Kevin Cheng)
 Won: My Favourite Female Character (Myolie Wu)
 Nominated: Best Drama - Top 5
 Nominated: Best Supporting Actor (Sam Lee)
 Nominated: Best Supporting Actor (Alex Lam) - Top 5
 Nominated: Best Supporting Actress (Joyce Tang)
 Nominated: My Favourite Female Character (Sharon Chan)
 Nominated: Most Improved Male Artiste (Alex Lam) - Top 5
 Nominated: Most Improved Female Artiste (Mandy Wong) - Top 5
 Nominated: Most Improved Female Artiste (Katy Kung) - Top 5

My Astro on Demand Favourites Awards 2011
Won: My Favourite Drama
Won: My Favourite Actor (Kevin Cheng)
Won: My Favourite Supporting Actress (Sharon Chan)
Won: My Favourite Television Character (Kevin Cheng)
Nominated: My Favourite Supporting Actor (Alex Lam) - Top 5
Nominated: My Favourite On-screen Couple (Kevin Cheng & Myolie Wu) - Top 5
Nominated: My Favourite Potential Actor (Alex Lam) - Top 5
Nominated: My Favourite Potential Actress (Sharon Chan) - Top 5
Nominated: My Favourite Theme Song (Hanjin Tan & Jin Au-yeung) - Top 5

Viewership ratings

References

External links
TVB.com Ghetto Justice - Official Website 
K for TVB English Synopsis 
spcnet.tv Ghetto Justice Reviews 

TVB dramas
2011 Hong Kong television series debuts
2011 Hong Kong television series endings